Stephen Jameson may refer to:

A singer with the British group The Javells
A character in The Tomorrow People